Ojibwa is a town in Sawyer County, Wisconsin, United States. The population was 267 at the 2000 census. The unincorporated community of Ojibwa is located in the town.

Geography
According to the United States Census Bureau, the town has a total area of 51.4 square miles (133.2 km2), of which, 50.8 square miles (131.6 km2) of it is land and 0.6 square miles (1.5 km2) of it (1.13%) is water.

Demographics
As of the census of 2000, there were 267 people, 110 households, and 83 families residing in the town. The population density was 5.3 people per square mile (2.0/km2). There were 265 housing units at an average density of 5.2 per square mile (2.0/km2). The racial makeup of the town was 96.63% White, 2.25% Native American, and 1.12% from two or more races. Hispanic or Latino of any race were 0.37% of the population.

There were 110 households, out of which 23.6% had children under the age of 18 living with them, 69.1% were married couples living together, 1.8% had a female householder with no husband present, and 24.5% were non-families. 21.8% of all households were made up of individuals, and 11.8% had someone living alone who was 65 years of age or older. The average household size was 2.43 and the average family size was 2.76.

In the town, the population was spread out, with 21.3% under the age of 18, 3.4% from 18 to 24, 25.1% from 25 to 44, 31.5% from 45 to 64, and 18.7% who were 65 years of age or older. The median age was 45 years. For every 100 females, there were 113.6 males. For every 100 females age 18 and over, there were 114.3 males.

The median income for a household in the town was $41,667, and the median income for a family was $43,750. Males had a median income of $26,563 versus $21,071 for females. The per capita income for the town was $16,889. About 6.5% of families and 7.1% of the population were below the poverty line, including 8.2% of those under the age of eighteen and none of those 65 or over.

References

External links
Winter Area Chamber of Commerce-Town of Ojibwa

Towns in Sawyer County, Wisconsin
Towns in Wisconsin